Inkheart is a 2003 young adult fantasy novel by Cornelia Funke, and the first book of the Inkheart series, which was continued with Inkspell (2005) and Inkdeath (2007). The novel won the 2004 BookSense Book of the Year Award for Children's Literature. Based on a 2007 online poll, the National Education Association listed the book as one of its "Teachers' Top 100 Books for Children".

Inkheart was the first part of a trilogy and was continued with Inkspell (2005), which won Funke her second BookSense Book of the Year Award for Children's Literature in 2006. The trilogy was initially concluded in Inkdeath, but has been revived in 2020 when Funke announced that a sequel called The Colour of Revenge was published by October 2021 in Germany.

Following the release of the first Inkheart novel, New Line Cinema bought the film rights to all three books for a cinema adaptation. Directed by Iain Softley, the film is based on a screenplay by David Lindsay-Abaire and features an ensemble cast that includes Brendan Fraser, Helen Mirren, Paul Bettany, Jim Broadbent, Rafi Gavron, Andy Serkis and newcomer Eliza Bennett, among others. Upon release, the film received mixed reviews. In 2009, a video game based on the film was released for the Nintendo DS.

Plot

Twelve-year-old Meggie lives with her father Mortimer or "Mo," who works as a bookbinder. One night, a man named Dustfinger visits Mo. Meggie overhears Dustfinger telling Mo that a man named Capricorn is looking for him. The next morning, Mo unexpectedly announces that he and Meggie have to go to Meggie's Aunt Elinor's house because Mo has to fix some books. Dustfinger joins them on the way. Mo sets off to work, and Meggie talks to Dustfinger, where she is introduced to Dustfinger's pet marten, Gwin. A short while after, Mo is captured by people with unusual names, bringing along with him a book, Inkheart. Meggie and Elinor tell the police, but the police just think they are out of their minds.

Dustfinger, Meggie, and Elinor plan to venture to Capricorn's village where her father is being held. The three are taken to Capricorn's house where he waits for them. Elinor and Meggie are thrown into the cell where Mo is being held and they reunite, while Dustfinger disappears. Meggie makes Mo tells the story of why they were there.

A long time ago her father was reading Inkheart to Meggie's mother, Teresa. Mo found out that he had a special gift where he could bring things out of books just by reading aloud, but that came with a price: for everything that comes out of the book, something must go in. So, while reading the seventh chapter, three of the main characters from the book, Capricorn, Basta, and Dustfinger, come out of the book and into their house. Capricorn tries to fight Mo, but eventually Mo forces them out of his house. When he turns back, Teresa and their two cats that were sitting on her lap were gone and Meggie was crying. He later tried many more times to get his wife out of the book, but his power failed him.

Capricorn makes Mo read aloud. When Mo starts to read Tales from A Thousand and One Nights, a boy named Farid appears out of the book and is also imprisoned. That night, Dustfinger breaks out all of the prisoners.

Elinor returns home, while Dustfinger, Farid, Meggie, and Mo go to visit Fenoglio, the author of Inkheart, since Capricorn had burned all copies of the book except his own. They are disappointed when they learn Fenoglio does not have another copy.

Fenoglio offers them an apartment so that they can live there for the time being when Mo fixes Fenoglio's books. Mo, on an urgent call from Elinor, goes to the airport leaving Meggie with Fenoglio and his three grandchildren.

Fenoglio and Meggie are captured by Capricorn's men and imprisoned in an attic in Capricorn's house, where Meggie discovers that she also has her father's power.

Farid and Dustfinger sneak into the village where Dustfinger meets one of his old friends, Resa. Resa is a mute who came out of the Inkheart story a while back. Resa and Dustfinger conspire a plan to get Inkheart from Capricorn, but are caught.

Fenoglio then starts writing a counter curse for when Meggie has to read out a horrible villain called the Shadow. Gwin passes notes back and forth between Mo and Meggie, which are written in Elvish, to let them know what was happening.

Elinor and Mo arrive at the village, but Elinor then gets caught and is put in the crypt with Resa and Dustfinger.

Meggie asks to see Dustfinger and finds that Resa is her mother. Farid and Mo set Capricorn's house on fire. While everyone is paying attention to the fire, Meggie switches out the planned reading for Fenoglio's handwritten story. She creates the Shadow and turns it against its master. Mo reads the beginning of last paragraph, killing Capricorn.

Meggie then finishes the tale and the Shadow turns back into the fairies, glass men, and trolls whose ashes it was created from. Many of the magical creatures come home with Elinor. Meggie, Mo, and Resa, go and live in Elinor's large house. Gwin, Dustfinger, and Farid leave in the night after Dustfinger steals the last remaining copy of Inkheart from Mo.

Characters
Meggie Folchart: A 12-year-old, avid reader, and the daughter of  Mortimer "Silvertongue" Folchart, ambitious and troublesome. She also has the ability to read things out of books like her father. She inherits her love for books from her father. She has blonde hair and blue eyes.
Mortimer "Mo" Folchart/Silvertongue: Father of Meggie. He has the ability to read characters out of stories, just like his daughter. He is the husband to Resa who got read into the book Inkheart when Mo accidentally read Capricorn and Basta out along with Dustfinger.
Dustfinger: A character from a book called Inkheart.  Dustfinger was read out of the book by Mortimer. Dustfinger is a skilled performer who uses fire, otherwise known as a fire-eater.  He has a horned marten called Gwin as his companion. He is described as having three faint scars on his face from being cut by Basta and having sandy-colored hair. Throughout Inkheart, he searches only for the book, which is the only way back to his world. Although he betrayed Mortimer and sold him out to Capricorn, he only did so because Capricorn had promised that he would be sent back home. He protects Meggie on a few occasions, and is not truly evil. He does not fit into the world he was read into, and cares only for returning home to his family, which is the reason for many of his seemingly cruel deeds. He is known for being very stealthy and skilled at remaining unseen. He has a calm and collected expression and attitude at almost all times.
Capricorn: Another character from Inkheart, he was also read out of the book by Mortimer. He is a mob boss. Capricorn is a very tall, gaunt man, pale as parchment, with short bristly hair, and very pale bright eyes. He is the main antagonist in the first book. He only cares about himself, and does not want to go back to his own world and time. When he was a child, he was cruelly beaten if he cried or showed any types of pity towards someone, which produced his evil characteristics.
Gwin: Dustfinger's horned pet marten who lives in Dustfinger's backpack. He is not trained so he usually bites Dustfinger.
Elinor Loredan: Aunt of Mo's wife who disappeared.  Elinor is a recluse who is proud of her collection of books. At first, she is somewhat rude to Meggie, fearing that Meggie will ruin her books, but warms up to her when she realizes that Meggie loves books just as much as she does.
Basta: Character from the book Inkheart. He has a thin angular face with close set eyes, not tall with narrow shoulders. There is a note of fury about him, and he is extremely superstitious. Unlike other of Capricorn's men who wear all black, Basta wears a white shirt. Basta is very fond of the knife he carries.
Flatnose: One of Capricorn's henchmen, who was read out of Inkheart by Darius. He is described as a tall, broad man whose face appears as if a giant had pushed in his face with a thumb.
Darius: A nervous, small, thin man no older than Mortimer.  Darius is described as having a badly bent back and wearing glasses. Capricorn had discovered that he can also read characters out of books, but does this poorly, with the characters having various deformities, due to his stuttering.
Farid: A young boy read out from the book Tales from the Thousand and One Nights. Farid becomes a companion of Dustfinger. Becomes very skilled at "playing with fire". He also develops a soft-spot for Meggie.
Fenoglio: The author of Inkheart. He has three grandchildren, Ricco, Paula, and Pippo.
Mortola (the Magpie): Read out of Inkheart by Darius. She has a vulture-like face. Her eyes are set close together and her jaw juts forward. Her legs are swelled, and wrapped in bandages. She is very cruel, as Basta claims "Compared to her my heart is as soft as a child's cuddly thing".
The Shadow: The creature only appears when Capricorn calls it, leaping from the ground like fire. The Shadow is made from the ashes of all of the creatures that Capricorn burned. The concept of the Shadow is similar to that of the "Nothing" in Michael Ende's The Neverending Story.
Teresa "Resa" Folchart: Wife of Mo, mother of Meggie, and niece of Elinor. She disappeared into the book when Mortimer first read Dustfinger, Basta, and Capricorn out of it. Later it is discovered she had lost her voice.

Critical reception 
Kirkus Reviews declared it "a true feast for anyone who has ever been lost in a book". Writing in The Guardian, Diana Wynne Jones stated "I don't think I've ever read anything that conveys so well the joys, terrors and pitfalls of reading".

Sequels
The sequel Inkspell was released on October 1, 2005. The third book in the trilogy, Inkdeath, was released on September 28, 2007.

Film adaptation

Following the release of the first Inkheart novel, New Line Cinema bought the film rights to all three books for a cinema adaptation. Funke moved to Los Angeles in 2005 after she had accepted the offer to participate as the film's producer alongside Barry Mendel. Principal photography on the Inkheart film began in 2006.

Directed by Iain Softley, the film is based on a screenplay by David Lindsay-Abaire and features an ensemble cast that includes Brendan Fraser, Helen Mirren, Paul Bettany, Jim Broadbent, Rafi Gavron, Andy Serkis and newcomer Eliza Bennett, among others. Upon release, the film received mixed reviews. In 2009, a video game based on the film was released for the Nintendo DS.

References

External links
 National Education Association (2007). "Teachers' Top 100 Books for Children".
  Official Cornelia Funke website
 Scholastic site

2003 German novels
German children's novels
German fantasy novels
Inkheart trilogy books
2003 fantasy novels
German novels adapted into films
2003 children's books